Aleksander Peepre (since 1936 Peekaln; 12 March 1915 – 3 January 1976) was an Estonian Nordic combined skier, coach and sport pedagogue.

He was born in Tallinn.

He participated on 1938 world championships. He was multiple-times Estonian champion in different winter sports disciplines, including slalom.

1941–1943 he taught skiing for German soldiers. 1943–1944 he was in Finnish military service. Later he moved to Canada.

References

1915 births
1979 deaths
Estonian male Nordic combined skiers
Estonian sports coaches
Estonian World War II refugees
Estonian emigrants to Canada
Sportspeople from Tallinn